The 2020–21 season was Manchester City Women's Football Club's 33rd season of competitive football and their eighth season in the FA Women's Super League, the highest level of English women's football.

Gareth Taylor was appointed manager ahead of the new season on 28 May 2020, taking over from Alan Mahon who had been put in charge on an interim basis following the departure of Nick Cushing during the previous campaign.

Pre-season

Competitions

Community Shield

In August 2020, the FA announced the return of the Women's FA Community Shield for the first time since 2008. The tie was contested between 2019–20 FA WSL winners Chelsea and Manchester City who qualified as reigning 2019 FA Cup winners due to the unfinished nature of the 2019–20 Women's FA Cup. The match was part of a Wembley double-header on the same day as the men's equivalent and played behind closed doors.

Women's Super League

League table

Results summary

Results by matchday

Results

FA Cup 

As a member of the top two tiers, Manchester City will enter FA Cup in the fourth round proper. Originally scheduled to take place on 31 January 2021, it was delayed due to COVID-19 restrictions. The competition recommenced with the remaining first round fixture on 31 March with the fourth round scheduled for the weekend 17–18 April 2021. Due to the delay, the competition only reached the fifth round before the end of the season. It resumed at the quarter-final stage the following season on 29 September 2021.

League Cup 

Group stage

Knockout stage

Champions League 

Round of 32

Round of 16

Quarter-finals

Squad information

Playing statistics

Starting appearances are listed first, followed by substitute appearances after the + symbol where applicable.

|-
|colspan="16"|Players away from the club on loan:

|-
|colspan="16"|Joined during 2021–22 season but competed in the postponed 2020–21 FA Cup:

|-
|colspan="16"|Players who appeared for the club but left during the season:

|}

Transfers and loans

Transfers in

Transfers out

Loans out

References

Manchester City
2020